WiscNet is a non-profit organization that maintains a computer network for Internet access for school districts, colleges, universities, and libraries in the U.S. state of Wisconsin. As of 2013, WiscNet was the Internet provider for over half of school districts and public libraries in the state.  WiscNet was founded in 1990. Its services are not restricted to government owned institutions.

References

External links
Official website

Educational technology companies of the United States
Non-profit organizations based in Wisconsin
Internet service providers of the United States